Tuxtilla is a municipality located in the south zone in the State of Veracruz, about 175 km from state capital Xalapa. It has a surface of 168.62 km2. The name comes from the language Náhuatl, Tuz-Tlan. It is bounded by Cosamaloapan to the north, Chacaltianguis to the east and the state of Oaxaca to the south.

Agriculture

It produces principally maize, beans, mango and sugarcane.

Celebrations

In May, the municipality hosts a celebration to honor San Isidro Labrador, Patron of the town. In December, the town holds a celebration to honor the Virgen de Guadalupe.

Weather

The weather in  Tuxtilla  is very warm and wet all year with rains in summer and autumn.

References

External links 

  Municipal Official webpage
  Municipal Official Information

Municipalities of Veracruz